Norman Creek may refer to:

Norman Creek (footballer), an English footballer
Norman Creek (Queensland), a stream in Queensland, Australia
Norman Creek (Missouri), a stream in the Missouri, United States